Sami Al-Husaini (Arabic: سامي الحسيني; born 29 September 1989) is a Bahraini professional footballer who plays as a striker for Al-Busaiteen.

International career

International goals
Scores and results list Bahrain's goal tally first.

References

External links
 
 

1989 births
Living people
Bahraini footballers
Bahrain international footballers
Association football forwards
2015 AFC Asian Cup players
2019 AFC Asian Cup players
Sportspeople from Manama